Daily Star may refer to:

United States
 Arizona Daily Star, published in Tucson, Arizona
 Cincinnati Daily Star (1872–1880), merged with the Spirit of the Times to form The Cincinnati Times-Star, Ohio 
 The Fredericksburg Daily Star, Fredericksburg, Virginia, predecessor to The Free Lance–Star
 Daily Star (Louisiana), Hammond, Louisiana
 The Daily Star (Oneonta), Oneonta, New York
 The Marion Star, formerly The Marion Daily Star, Marion, Ohio
 Minneapolis Daily Star (1920–about 1939), a predecessor of the Star Tribune, Minneapolis, Minnesota
 Warrensburg Star-Journal, formerly The Daily Star-Journal, Warrensburg, Missouri

Canada
The Montreal Daily Star, a former name of the Montreal Star, Montreal, Quebec
Regina Daily Star, a predecessor of the Leader-Post, Regina, Saskatchewan
Toronto Daily Star, former name of the Toronto Star, Toronto, Ontario

Elsewhere
 Daily Star (United Kingdom), a British tabloid newspaper
 The Daily Star (Bangladesh), a Bangladeshi broadsheet newspaper
 The Daily Star (Lebanon), an English-language newspaper published in Lebanon
 Irish Daily Star, an Irish tabloid newspaper

Fictional
 Daily Star (DC Comics), in Superman stories published between 1938 and 1986

See also
Star (newspaper), the name of various newspapers